Mungindi Airport is a public airport in Moree Plains Shire, located  north east of Mungindi, New South Wales Australia. The airport is predominantly used for general aviation and agricultural purposes as well as handling aeromedical patient transfers from the Mungindi Hospital. Federal government funding secured in 2009/10 allowed upgrades to the airport, including sealing the runway which is equipped with pilot-activated lighting allowing 24-hour operations.

See also
List of airports in New South Wales

References

Airports in New South Wales